Sinatra: Featuring Don Costa and His Orchestra was a 1969 Emmy nominated television special starring Frank Sinatra, broadcast Wednesday, November 5, 1969, on CBS.

Set list
 "For Once in My Life" (Ron Miller, Orlando Murden)
 "Please Be Kind" (Saul Chaplin, Sammy Cahn)
 "My Way" (Paul Anka, Claude François, Jacques Revaux, Gilles Thibault)
 Film clip medley with song highlights of: "I Couldn't Sleep a Wink Last Night"/"You're Sensational"/"All the Way"/"(Love Is) The Tender Trap" (Harold Adamson, Jimmy McHugh)/(Cole Porter)/(Cahn, Jimmy Van Heusen)/(Cahn, Van Heusen) 
 "Little Green Apples" (Bobby Russell)
 "Out Beyond the Window" (Rod McKuen)
 "A Man Alone" (McKuen)
 "Didn't We?" (Jimmy Webb)
 "Forget to Remember" (Victoria Pike, Teddy Randazzo)
 "Fly Me to the Moon" (Bart Howard)
 "Street of Dreams" (Sam M. Lewis, Victor Young)
 "Love's Been Good to Me" (McKuen)
 "Goin' Out of My Head" (Randazzo, Bobby Weinstein)
 "My Kind of Town" (Cahn, Van Heusen)

Personnel
Director: Tim Kiley
Musical Director: Don Costa
Music Supervisor: Sonny Burke
Music Coordinators: Irving Weiss, Bill Miller
Executive Producer: Frank Sinatra
Producer: Carolyn Raskin 
Writer: Sheldon Keller

References

External links

1960s American television specials
1969 television specials
CBS television specials
Frank Sinatra television specials